The Scottish Swimming Hall of Fame, launched in 2010 by Scottish Swimming, is an accolade (and virtual platform) to recognize and celebrate the lifetime achievements of memorable Scottish athletes in all fields of aquatic sports. It is an event that takes place in a Commonwealth Games year, with the ceremony held at the annual awards dinner.

Criteria 
Nominations can be made by Clubs, Districts, SASA Life Members, Board, Council or National Committees. Nominees should contain full details of their aquatic career.

Nominees must have been an athlete. Nominees must have retired from International Competition for at least two years in the Discipline for which they are being nominated (not including Masters Events).

Nominees should have achieved one of the following standards. However, achievement of one of the following standards is not a guarantee of an automatic nomination or of a nomination being accepted.
 An Olympic or Paralympic Games Medallist
 A World Championship Medallist
 A European Gold Medallist
 A Commonwealth Gold Medallist
 Been awarded 50 GB Senior Caps for Water Polo

When nominations are being considered medalists from individual events are recognized ahead of relay medalists.

Hall of Fame

2010 
The inaugural event was held at the Glasgow Science Centre in September 2010.

2014 
The event was held at the Kelvingrove Art Gallery and Museum on 13 September 2014. It was hosted by former Olympian and BBC commentator, Steve Parry.

2018 
The event was held at the Radisson Blu hotel in Glasgow on 29 September 2018. It was hosted by TV Presenter and journalist, Lee McKenzie.

References

External links 
 Scottish Swimming Hall of Fame Scottish Swimming.
 Scottish Swimming Hall of Fame Information Scottish Swimming.

Swimming
Scotland
Scotland
Hall of Fame
Scotland
Scotland
2010 establishments in Scotland